Nguyễn Biểu (Chinese characters 阮表) (Documented as 1350 - 1413), was the home minister Hau Tran in Vietnam history. He was born in the village of Nghe An town (now in Yen Ho, Duc Tho, Ha Tinh).

Biography
Nguyễn Biểu was born in Bình Hòa (Thuận An, Bình Hồ), Chi La, (Nghệ An) and later moved to Yên Hồ, (Nghệ Tĩnh) (Hà Tĩnh) city. He chart Thai last student and the Trần Thi Điển money censor. In 1413, Chongqing Optical date Thursday, Minister Minh Truong Phu, hit Nghe An, Quang Trung King back in Hoa Chau, sent him to the side of the camp to negotiate. To test his spirit, Accessories capita screaming engines. Nguyen statement did not tremble, decent eating and said, "that we eat first South North a" and a poem about it. Then, Fathers hold him back. He defied that: "In the stratagem rated for water users, in addition to the soldiers that flaunt. Before speaking descendants founded the Tran, this land used to divide districts; not the plunder of wealth, even massacres of civilians and military reverse is true hackers ". Accessories are very angry, tied him to the bridge wrong Lam rising tide to drown him. Nghe Tinh People's domain set up shrines, worshiped him as "That Great".

Notable works
He authored several works of poetry, including:
Human head feast
In 1413, Ming's army hit Nghe An, King Trùng Quang ran into Hóa Châu, sent Nguyễn Biểu to meet Trương Phụ to reconcile, on purpose of postponement, fishing time for Đặng Dung and Nguyễn Cảnh Dị to gain force. During the meal, Truong Phu treated Nguyen Bieu served with a boiled human head on a tray to threaten him. However, Nguyễn Biểu's face displayed enjoyment while eating the "northern troop head," and, in addition, he created a poem titled "human head feast" while eating.
Quang Trung's problem off his poetic painting porcelain.
Extra copy of a work is made by their collective Hoàng in Nghệ Tĩnh.

Death
Nguyễn Biểu died in 1413 after illness at the age of 63.

Temple of Nguyễn Biểu

After defeating Ming's army, King Le Thai To built Nguyễn Biểu temple in Nội Diên (now in Yên Hồ Cummune, Đức Thọ District), named him as king of onus.

During King Le Thanh Tong's reign, a temple of Nguyễn Biểu was built in Bình Hồ. By the end of the 18th century, the temple was burned.

In 1869, the people restored the temple.

In 1968, the lower zone of the temple and the middle zone's roof was destroyed by US army's bomb. The temple was stolen several times, especially two wooden statues was lost.

Nguyễn Biểu temple was recognized as a national historical monument in 1991. The temple was renovated several times, in 2007, the state restored the middle zone.

1350 births
1413 deaths
Vietnamese government officials